Andreas Gaebler (born 17 April 1984) is a German former professional footballer who played as a centre-back.

References

1984 births
Living people
German footballers
Association football central defenders
SV Darmstadt 98 players
SV Wilhelmshaven players
1. FC Kaiserslautern II players
1. FC Magdeburg players
FC 08 Homburg players
3. Liga players
Regionalliga players
21st-century German people